The Faroese Women's Volleyball Championship is an annual competition of the Faroese women's volleyball teams. It has been held since 1969. 
The Competitions are held in three divisions - Premier League, Division 1 and Division 2. The championships are organised by the Faroese Volleyball Union.

Formula of the competition
The 2021/22 Premier League championship was held in two stages - preliminary and final. In the preliminary stage the teams played in 3 rounds. The top two teams advanced to the final and in a series of two matches to determine the champion. In case of a tie, a "golden" set was provided. 
For victories 3-0 and 3-1 teams get 3 points, for winning 3-2 - 2 points, for defeat 2-3 - 1 point, for defeats 1:3 and 0-3 no points are awarded. 
Six teams participated in the 2021/22 Premier League Championship: "Flair" (Torshavn), SI (Sørvagur), "Drottur" (Midvagur), KIF (Kollafjörður), TB (Tvörojri), Mjölnir (Klaksvik). Flair won the championship title, beating SI 1-1 (3-2, 1–3) in the final series, the "gold" set 15–12. Third place went to Drottour.

Winners List

References

External links
 Faroe Islands Volleyball

 

Faroese League
Faroese League